Tandzut or Tandzout may refer to:
Tandzut, Armavir, Armenia
Tandzut, Tavush, Armenia
Tandzut River, Armenia